Juan Bautista Idiarte Borda y Soumastre (April 20, 1844 – August 25, 1897) was the 17th President of Uruguay. He is the only Uruguayan president to be assassinated in office.

Background

Originating from the Uruguayan department of Soriano, which he was to represent in Uruguay's chamber of deputies, Idiarte was a member of the Colorado Party, which dominated the country's politics for many years.

President of Uruguay

On March 21, 1894 Duncan Stewart, interim President of Uruguay stepped down, and Idiarte replaced him in that office.

Strife on various fronts

Idiarte's presidency was beset by a number of severe difficulties which found their origins in a host of commercial, ideological and personality issues, in the background of Uruguay's intermittent Civil War. In addition, the nature of the ruling Colorado Party of the period was seen as particularly fractious.

Public works

Idiarte's term of office, however, was also characterized by a program of public works. This included the development of the Port of Montevideo and the establishment of a national Bank.

Assassination

On August 25, 1897, Idiarte was assassinated by Avelino Arredondo with a revolver, who had been erroneously identified several months earlier (in El Día, edited by José Batlle y Ordóñez) as a would-be assassin during a previous incident. While Idiarte's family warned him of an assassination plot on the part of his party enemies, and although the assassin was a known strong supporter of Batlle, the latter successfully maintained a plausible deniability in connection with the crime, the only instance to date of a presidential assassination in the history of Uruguay.

Subsequently, the reputation of Idiarte was greatly overshadowed by that of José Batlle y Ordóñez, who later became a long-serving President.

See also
 Politics of Uruguay

References

1844 births
1897 deaths
1897 murders in South America
Presidents of Uruguay
Assassinated Uruguayan politicians
Assassinated heads of state
People murdered in Uruguay
Deaths by firearm in Uruguay
Uruguayan people of Basque descent
Uruguayan people of Catalan descent
Colorado Party (Uruguay) politicians